Qullqi Mach'ay (Quechua qullqi silver, mach'ay cave, "silver cave", hispanicized spelling Culquimachay) is a mountain in the Andes of Peru which reaches an altitude of approximately . It is located in the Junín Region, Yauli Province, Carhuacayan District. Qullqi Mach'ay lies southwest of the lake named Waskhaqucha.

References

Mountains of Peru
Mountains of Junín Region